The Subprefecture of São Mateus is one of 32 subprefectures of the city of São Paulo, Brazil.  It comprises three districts: São Mateus, São Rafael, and Iguatemi.

References

Subprefectures of São Paulo